TV Rain (stylized as ДО///ДЬ) is an independent Russian television channel. Launched in 2010, it has been based in the Netherlands since 2023. It focuses on news, discussions, culture, politics, business reports, and documentaries, with most shows broadcast live. TV Rain is owned by journalist Natalya Sindeyeva. Its slogan is "Optimistic Channel."

In March 2022, Russian authorities blocked access to TV Rain in response to its coverage of the 2022 Russian invasion of Ukraine. The channel relaunched from studios in Latvia in July, but after multiple violations had its license cancelled in December. TV Rain continued to broadcast via YouTube and received a Dutch broadcast license in January 2023.

History

Early years 

TV Rain was founded in 2010 by two women, Natalya Sindeyeva, media entrepreneur and owner, and Vera Krichevskaya, a TV and documentary film director. It has focused on news, discussions, culture, politics, business reports, and documentaries. Most Dozhd shows have been live broadcasts with a motto to "talk about important things with those who are important to us". It is owned by journalist Natalya Sindeyeva.

Dozhd was one of the first channels in Russia to cover the 2011 Russian protests against the alleged rigging of the parliamentary elections. President Dmitry Medvedev was also noticed to have unfollowed Dozhd on Twitter. However, the channel was the first mass media outlet that he had chosen to follow on Twitter, according to an RIA Novosti report. On 9 December 2011, Dozhd was asked to provide copies of its coverage of the protests to check if it had abided by Russian media laws. By 10 December, it was showing a white ribbon, a symbol of the protests, by its on-screen logo. The station's owner, Sindeyeva, explained this as being a sign of "sincerity", rather than "propaganda", and an attempt to be "mediators" instead of simply journalists.

Siege of Leningrad controversy 

On 26 January 2014, Dozhd ran a poll on its website and on its live "Dilettantes" discussion program asking viewers if Leningrad should have been surrendered to the invading Nazi army in order to save hundreds of thousands of lives during the siege of Leningrad. Presenters cited Viktor Astafyev and compared it with the 1812 capture of vacant Moscow. Within 30 minutes, Dozhd removed the poll and apologized for incorrect wording. In the following days Dozhd was criticized by politicians, activists, State Duma members and Valentina Matvienko for its online poll on the Leningrad siege of World War II. Dmitry Peskov, Vladimir Putin's press secretary, also criticized the channel and said that they violated "more than a law". Yuri Pripachkin, President of the Cable Television Association of Russia (AKTR), said that he wanted "to take functions of censoring". In a resolution backed by the St. Petersburg legislature's deputies, Prosecutor General Yury Chaika was requested to "conduct an investigation into provocative material posted on the website of the Dozhd television channel … and take appropriate measures, including shutting down the channel". On 29 January, the largest Russian TV providers disconnected the channel. Dozhd was forced to move to a private apartment in October 2014. In November 2013, two months before the controversy, Dozhd broadcast a report by anti-corruption activist Alexei Navalny investigating high-ranking officials including Vyacheslav Volodin. The channel's owner, Natalya Sindeyeva, suggested that the program caused the campaign against the channel.

Foreign agent designation and suspension 
On 20 August 2021, the Ministry of Justice of the Russian Federation added Dozhd, along with the investigative website Important Stories (iStories), into the list of "foreign agents". As stated by a representative of the Ministry of Justice of the Russian Federation at the meeting with the members of Presidential Council for Civil Society and Human Rights, Dozhd was designated as "foreign agent" by the request of Federal Service for Supervision of Communications, Information Technology and Mass Media due to distribution of materials prepared by media and individuals which were declared "foreign agents" that receive donations or funding from outside Russia earlier, such as Meduza, Current Time TV, Lev Ponomaryov, Lyudmila Savitskaya. In response, Amnesty International criticized the move, stating that the authorities were "launching a campaign against independent media aimed at eradicating unbiased journalism and investigative reporting".

The Moscow Times reported that during the year-long prelude to the 2022 Russian invasion of Ukraine, the Russian government began to act against independent and critical media. In that period dozens of journalists and independent media agencies including Dozhd were designated as 'foreign agents' by the Russian authorities. The term foreign agent has Soviet-era undertones. Entities that are designated as foreign agents are obligated to disclose their sources of funding and have to label their publications including social media posts with the tag foreign agent. Violation of the obligation attracts fines.

In 2021, a full-length documentary film titled F@ck This Job was released. The film deals with work of Dozhd and its CEO Natalya Sindeyeva. The documentary was broadcast under its alternative title, Tango with Putin in the UK in March 2022 as part of the BBC documentary series, Storyville. The documentary had been due to receive its Moscow premiere and Russian distribution in early March 2022, which were cancelled due to bomb threats against the Moscow cinema, and new censorship rules following the Russian invasion of Ukraine.

On 24 February 2022, Russia launched a full-scale military invasion of Ukraine. On 1 March 2022, six days after the invasion began, the office of the Prosecutor-General of Russia ordered the country's censor, Roskomnadzor (arm of Russian government) to restrict access to Dozhd as well as Echo of Moscow due to their coverage of the invasion of Ukraine by Russian forces, claiming that they were spreading "deliberately false information about the actions of Russian military personnel" as well as "information calling for extremist activity" and "violence". On 2 March, Dozhd editor-in-chief Tikhon Dzyadko released a statement saying he and several other Dozhd workers had fled Russia, as "it became obvious that the personal safety of some of us is now under threat." On 3 March, Dozhd said it was temporarily suspending operations due to the forthcoming enactment of war censorship law, and towards the end of its final broadcast, the crew walked off-set and played Swan Lake in protest, in reference to the 1991 Soviet coup d'état attempt when channels could not report the news and instead played footage of the ballet.

Exile 
Tikhon Dzyadko stated on Twitter that the channel was going to broadcast not only from the Latvian capital, Riga, but also from several studios in the Netherlands, France and Georgia. According to Lyngsat.com, the channel reappeared on 2 June 2022 in a test format on the satellite Astra 5B and on its streaming website. On 18 July 2022, TV Rain resumed broadcasting from a studio in Riga. The channel's owner, Natalia Sindeeva, stated that the launch process would have several stages and would be finalized in autumn 2022.

On 1 December 2022, anchor Alexey Korostelev asked viewers to provide information about mobilization to publicize irregularities, saying: "We hope that we can help many service members, for example, with equipment and basic amenities at the front". The channel was criticized by Ukrainian activists over the statement, and Latvian Minister of Defence Artis Pabriks called on the channel to return to Russia. The next day, editor-in-chief Tikhon Dzyadko apologized, clarifying that the channel "has never been, is not, and will never be involved in assisting Russian armed forces with equipment" and stating that Korostelev had been fired. Three other employees, including hosts Margarita Lyutova and Vladimir Romensky, announced their departure from the channel over the firing.  The same day the channel was fined 10,000 euros by the NEPLP for using a map which showed Russian-annexed Crimea as part of Russia and referring to the Russian Armed Forces as "our army", the second major violation for TV Rain in recent months, according to the Latvian regulator.

On 6 December 2022, the NEPLP decided to cancel the channel's broadcasting license, citing "threats to national security and public order". Latvia's State Security Service also urged authorities to bar Korostelev from entering the country and warned Dzyadko of potential "criminal liability in case of committing criminal offenses". Latvian Minister of Foreign Affairs Edgars Rinkēvičs defended the decision to initially allow TV Rain to operate in Latvia, but reminded that the channel has to comply with Latvian laws on the basis of which it was allowed to work there and therefore should be held responsible. Tikhon Dzyadko called the Latvian regulator's decision to cancel the channel's licence a "farce", "absurd" and "devoid of common sense", claiming that TV Rain was not allowed to appeal the decision, and affirmed the channel's staunch opposition to the war in Ukraine. CEO Natalya Sindeyeva apologized to Korostelev, calling it "disgraceful" that he was fired for a "mistake", asking him to rejoin the channel as well as Lyutova and Romensky. 

Reporters Without Borders called on the Latvian regulator not to withdraw TV Rain's license. The Latvian Association of Journalists acknowledged TV Rain had "made a serious mistake", but believed the cancellation of licence was "disproportionate to the infringements committed". Russian-language news outlet Meduza, also based in Latvia, called the decision "unfair, wrong, and disproportionate to the official violations flagged by the agency" and called it an "an incredible gift to the Russian authorities". Kremlin spokesman Dmitry Peskov said to reporters that "some always think that there is a place better than home, that there is always more freedom than at home. This is one of the clearest examples that shows that these are the wrong illusions". In December 2022, Latvia's TV3 Group decided to evict TV Rain from its leased Riga studio in January 2023 in connection with channel's loss of license. However, the Latvian Office of Citizenship and Migration Affairs decided not to cancel employment visas issued to TV Rain employees.

On 5 January 2023, the channel paid the 10,000 euro fine imposed by NEPLP, but appealed against the 4,000 euro fine that was imposed for not providing a language track in Latvian. On 9 January, Dzyadko announced that the channel had received a broadcasting license in the Netherlands. The next day, the channel wrote that its editorial center would be moved to Amsterdam once its employees receive permission to work there and that it was appealing the NEPLP's decision to cancel its broadcasting license.

Funding 
Initially, Dozhd was planned as a niche television channel. Natalia Sindeeva invested her own money that she gained from the sale of a country house, to start the channel. Later, her husband, a Russian banker , joined her as a co-investor. According to Forbes, by 2013, Vinokurov spent at least 15% of his 200 million dollars wealth on the channel. Although Dozhd became popular, Vinokurov mentioned that, in fact, it was unprofitable during its first years of broadcasting. As a result, in autumn 2011, Sindeeva and Vinokurov started looking for sponsors. Mikhail Prokhorov and Alisher Usmanov considered investing money in the channel, but eventually neither deal was finalized. As of 2013, advertising constitued about 80% of Dozhd's revenue. In the same year, the channel introduced a paid subscription: the cost of an annual subscription was 1,000 Russian rubles, access to live broadcast for one day or to one program in the channel's webarchive was available for 30 rubles.

In 2014, after the siege of Leningrad controversy, Dozhd was disconnected from Russian cable television. Consequently, the channel lost most of its audience and advertising revenue. While Dozhd's monthly budget was about 26 million rubles at the time, advertising brought only 6 million rubles a month. Trying to compensate the losses, the channel raised the price of an annual subscription from 1,000 to 4,800 rubles. In addition, Dozhd organized a telemarathon and thus raised funds for two months of operations. In the same year, the channel signed an advertising contract with the European Union. According to Dozhd's financial report, in 2014-2019, the contract generated from three (2014) up to 11 (2016) million rubles a year. In 2015, Boris Zimin's Sreda Foundation invested 7.5 million rubles to support the channel. In 2020, Dozhd's revenue was about 342.3 million rubles, and its net profit was 13.6 million rubles. As of 2021, the channel received income from advertising, paid subscriptions, donations, and sales of promotional goods in its online store.

International availability
Dozhd website provides live broadcasting and archived programs. Dozhd is also broadcast on YouTube.

It was shut down because channel content implied Crimea was Russian territory. According to Dozhd owner Natalya Sindeyeva, Russian law requires that media use maps that show Crimea as a part of Russia. Since the 2014 Crimean crisis, the status of Crimea is under dispute between Russia and Ukraine; Ukraine and the majority of the international community considers Crimea an integral part of Ukraine, while Russia considers Crimea an integral part of Russia. Ukraine has since moved to ban RTVI for similar reasons.

Awards 

TV Rain is a recipient of TEFI (2011), Runet Prize (2013), Free Media Award (2014) and Peabody Award (2021). The channel's journalists received Redkollegia award six times and its former editor-in-chief Mikhail Zygar was a recipient of the International Press Freedom Award.

Programming and staff 
 Key people
 Natalya Sindeyeva – owner/CEO (2010–present)
 Tikhon Dzyadko – editor-in-chief (2019–present)
 Mikhail Zygar – former editor-in-chief (2010–2015)
 Roman Badanin – former editor-in-chief (2016–2017)
 Aleksandra Perepelova – former editor-in-chief (2017–2019)

 Current programs
 Here and Now (news) – Evgeniya Voskoboynikova, Darya Polygaeva, Kogershyn Sagieva, Grigoriy Aleksanyan, Mikhail Kozyrev, Denis Kataev.
 Here and Now: Night show (news) – Darya Polygaeva, Anna Mongait, Pavel Lobkov, Anton Zhelnov, .
 Hard Day's Night (interviews) – Anton Zhelnov.
 And so on with Mikhail Fishman – Mikhail Fishman, former editor-in-chef of Russian Newsweek.
 Money – Lev Parkhomenko, Vyacheslav Shiryaev, Artyom Torchinskiy, Margarita Lyutova, Stepan Danilov, Maya Nelyubina.
 Sindeyeva – Natalya Sindeyeva.
 Speak (interviews) – .
 Straight Line – Anna Nemzer, Anna Mongait, Kogershyn Sagieva, Lev Parkhomenko, Margarita Lyutova, Nadezhda Ivanitskaya, Stanislav Belkovsky, Victor Shenderovich.
 Movchan – Andrey Movchan.
 Kotrikadze of Foreign Affairs – Ekaterina Kotrikadze.

 Former programs
 Parfenov-Posner – Leonid Parfyonov and Vladimir Posner.
 Gosdep – Kseniya Sobchak.
 Sobchak – Kseniya Sobchak.
 Bremya Novostey - Pavel Lobkov, Kseniya Sobchak, Oleg Yasakov, Sergei Erzhenkov, Alexey Korostelev
 Citizen Poet – Dmitry Bykov, Mikhail Olegovich Yefremov.
 Prilepin – Zakhar Prilepin.
 Breakfasts with Aliona Doletskaya – Aliona Doletskaya.
 Kozyrev Online –  Mikail Kozyrev.
 Zygar – Mikhail Zygar.
 Kashin.Guru – Oleg Kashin.
 Burden of News – Pavel Lobkov, Kogershyn Sagieva, Ksenia Sobchak, Anna Mongait.
 It's Hard to be with God – Konstantin Eggert.
 Panopticon (debates) – Anna Nemzer, Kogershyn Sagieva, Alexander Nevzorov, Stanislav Belkovsky.

See also 
List of Russian-language television channels
Meduza, another independent media outlet based in Riga that also publishes in Russian
Silver Rain Radio, similarly named broadcaster also co-founded by Sindeyeva

References

External links

 
Live stream at the official website 
 
 

 
2010 establishments in Russia
2011–2013 Russian protests
2020s establishments in the Netherlands
2022 disestablishments in Russia
2022 establishments in Latvia
2022 disestablishments in Latvia
Companies based in Amsterdam
Free Media Awards winners
Media listed in Russia as foreign agents
Peabody Award winners
Russian-language television stations
Russian-language websites
Television channels and stations established in 2010
Television channels in the Netherlands